Félix Lambey (born 15 March 1994) is a French rugby union lock who currently plays for Lyon and France.

International career
Lambey was called up to the French national team for the first time ahead of France's opening 2018 Six Nations Championship match against Ireland.

References

External links
France profile at FFR
LOU profile
ESPN profile 

1994 births
Living people
French rugby union players
Rugby union locks
Lyon OU players
France international rugby union players
People from Lons-le-Saunier
Sportspeople from Jura (department)
AS Béziers Hérault players